Raquel Córcoles (born December 31, 1986), better known as Moderna de Pueblo, is a Spanish illustrator and author of comics.

Biography
Corcoles studied advertising, journalism and audiovisual communication at Rovira i Virgili University in Tarragona and has a degree in journalism from King Juan Carlos University in Madrid. She has been editor of InformativosTelecinco.com in charge of economic information. Corcoles started as a comic book illustrator in August 2011 in the magazine El Jueves, where she published a weekly comic page, and that same year she began to publish a weekly comic strip in the Cuore magazine. She also collaborates with other media such as GQ magazine and the newspaper El País.

Moderna de Pueblo
The name of Moderna de Pueblo ("Modern Villager") comes from a character created in 2010 in her blog. This character became a viral phenomenon with more than 200,000 followers on Facebook. Her comics are about a twenty-year-old blonde girl who always wears sunglasses and who moves out of town to succeed in the city. There are other characters stereotypical of urban culture, such as women with everyday problems, frustrated young people, interns and hipsters.

Bibliography

References 

1986 births
Living people
Spanish comics artists
Spanish comics writers
Spanish female comics artists
Female comics writers
People from Reus